Meile Louise Rockefeller (born December 5, 1955) is an American lawyer, philanthropist, heiress, and real-estate developer. She is the daughter of Rodman Clark Rockefeller and his first wife, Barbara Ann Olsen. Her paternal grandfather was New York Governor and U.S. Vice President Nelson Aldrich Rockefeller. She is a member of the Rockefeller family.

Education
Rockefeller earned a bachelor's degree in political economics from Williams College in 1979 and a Juris Doctor (J.D.) degree from New York University.

Career
Rockefeller is a lawyer, real-estate developer,  drug law reformer, and serves on the board of the Counseling Service of the Eastern District of New York.

Political protest
In 2002, at age 46, Rockefeller was arrested for protesting the "Rockefeller drug laws" which bear the name of her grandfather, who secured their passage as governor of the state of New York in 1973. She was accompanied by her brother, Stuart Rockefeller, and was supported by other members of the family on the issue, including her granduncle Laurance Rockefeller.

See also
Rockefeller family 
Nelson Rockefeller

References

1955 births
Living people
Rockefeller family
Winthrop family
American people of English descent
American people of German descent
People from Brooklyn
Lawyers from New York City
New York University School of Law alumni
Williams College alumni
Philanthropists from New York (state)
American women lawyers
American real estate businesspeople
Activists from New York City